Sar Sar (also Romanized as Sār Sar and Sarsār) is a village in Machian Rural District, Kelachay District, Rudsar County, Gilan Province, Iran. At the 2006 census, its population was 256, in 75 families.

References 

Populated places in Rudsar County